Edith of Wessex ( 1025 – 18 December 1075) was Queen of England from her marriage to Edward the Confessor in 1045 until Edward died in 1066. Unlike most English queens in the 10th and 11th centuries, she was crowned. The principal source on her life is a work she herself commissioned, the Vita Ædwardi Regis or the Life of King Edward who rests at Westminster, which is inevitably biased.

Early life
Edith was the daughter of Godwin, the most powerful earl in England. Her mother Gytha was sister of Ulf, a Danish earl who was Cnut the Great's brother-in-law. She was probably born in or before 1027. Edith was originally named Gytha, but renamed Ealdgyth (or Edith) when she married King Edward the Confessor. Her brothers were Sweyn (c. 1020 – 1052), Harold (later Harold II) (c. 1022 – 1066), Tostig (c. 1026 – 1066), Gyrth (c. 1030 – 1066), Leofwine (c. 1035 – 1066), and Wulfnoth (c. 1040 – 1094). Edith was the firstborn of Godwin's three daughters, which included her sisters Gunhild (or Gunhilda) (c. 1035 – 1080) and  Ælfgifu (c. 1035 – ?). The exact birthdates of the Godwin children are unknown, but Sweyn was the firstborn and Harold was the second son. Harold was aged about 25 in 1045, which makes his birth date around 1020.

Edith was brought up at Wilton Abbey. She was an educated woman who spoke several languages, skills she probably acquired at Wilton. She remained attached to it, and in later years rebuilt its church. Her niece, Gunhild of Wessex, would also be educated at Wilton.

The Vita Edwardi emphasised her piety. She helped Giso, the Bishop of Wells, secure the endowments of his see, and gave lands to Abingdon Abbey, but the monks of Evesham alleged that she had the relics of many monasteries brought to Gloucester so that she could select the best for herself. When Gervin, abbot of Saint-Riquier, who was visiting the English court, rejected her kiss of greeting, she took offence. Edward reproved her, and she accepted the rebuff, even going on to urge English churchmen not to kiss women, although they did not object to the custom.

Edith lost four of her brothers in a very short span. Tostig died on 25 September 1066 during the Battle of Stamford Bridge. Three others – Harold, Gyrth, and Leofwine – all died on 14 October 1066, during the Battle of Hastings.

Marriage and life as queen
Edith married Edward on 23 January 1045. Unlike most wives of the Saxon kings of England in the tenth and eleventh centuries, Edith was crowned queen. The marriage produced no children. Later ecclesiastical writers claimed that this was either because Edward took a vow of celibacy, or because he refused to consummate the marriage because of his antipathy to Edith's family, the Godwins. However, this is dismissed by modern historians. In the view of Edward's biographer, Frank Barlow, "the theory that Edward's childlessness was due to deliberate abstention from sexual relations lacks authority, plausibility and diagnostic value."

In 1051 Godwin and his sons fell out with Edward and fled the country. Edith was sent to a nunnery, possibly because she was childless and Edward hoped to divorce her. When the Godwins effected their return through force in 1052, Edith was reinstated as queen. In later years, she became one of Edward's inner group of advisers. In the Vita Edwardi, according to Barlow, "although she is always placed modestly behind the throne, the author does not minimize her power or completely conceal her will. Whenever we catch sight of her elsewhere, we see a determined woman, interfering, hard, probably bad-tempered."

As the king's wife, she was responsible for his regal presentation. She commissioned works for his personal ornament, and had at least one goldsmith among her tenants. When he died, the Domesday Book shows that she was the richest woman in England, and the fourth wealthiest individual, after the king, Stigand, Archbishop of Canterbury, and her brother Harold. She held land valued at between £1,570 and £2,000 per annum.

She was close to her brother Tostig, and in 1055 she and Harold secured his appointment as Earl of Northumbria. His rule was unpopular, and in 1064 Edith was accused at court of engineering the murder of the Northumbrian noble Gospatrick in Tostig's interest. In 1065 Tostig was probably hunting with King Edward when the northerners rebelled and elected Morcar, Harold's brother-in-law, as earl. Tostig charged Harold with conspiring with the rebels, a charge which Harold purged himself of with a public oath. Edward demanded that the rebels be suppressed, but to his and Edith's fury Harold and the English thegns refused to enforce the order. Morcar was confirmed as earl and Tostig forced into exile.

Later life and death
Upon Edward's death (5 January 1066), he was succeeded by Edith's brother, Harold Godwinson. At the Battle of Stamford Bridge (25 September 1066) and the Battle of Hastings (14 October 1066), Edith lost four of her remaining brothers (Tostig, Harold, Gyrth and Leofwine). Her brother Wulfnoth, who had been given to Edward the Confessor as a hostage in 1051 and soon afterwards became a prisoner of William the Conqueror, remained in captivity in Normandy.  Edith was therefore the only senior member of the Godwin family to survive the Norman conquest on English soil, the sons of Harold having fled to Ireland.

Carola Hicks, an art historian, has recently put her forward as a candidate for the author of the Bayeux Tapestry.

After Edward's death, Edith read the lives of English saints, and gave information about St Kenelm to his hagiographer, Goscelin. She died at Winchester on 18 December 1075. Matthew Paris records a tradition that her death brought an end to an illness from which she had been suffering at some length. She was buried together with her husband in Westminster Abbey and her funeral was arranged by William. The northern author of the Anglo-Saxon Chronicle, Manuscript D, reports:

See also
House of Wessex family tree
Godwin family tree
Cnut the Great's family tree

Citations

Bibliography
 Barlow, Frank (1997) Edward the Confessor, Yale University Press: London
 Stafford, Pauline (1997). Queen Emma and Queen Edith: Queenship and Women's Power in Eleventh-Century England, Blackwell 
 Stafford, Pauline (2009). 'Edith, Edward's Wife and Queen', pp. 129–138 in Richard Mortimer ed., Edward the Confessor: The Man and the Legend, The Boydell Press

External links
 

|-

1020s births
1075 deaths
Anglo-Saxon women
Anglo-Saxon royal consorts
House of Godwin
11th-century English people
11th-century English women
Burials at Westminster Abbey
House of Wessex
Daughters of British earls